The Good Life is the fourth studio album by American country music artist Andy Griggs, and his first for Montage Music Group after exiting RCA Records Nashville in 2005. It was released on February 12, 2008 to iTunes and Ruckus, while the CD was released to retail stores on May 27, 2008. "Tattoo Rose" and "What If It's Me" were both released as singles from this album, and both have charted on the Hot Country Songs charts. "Long Way Down" was also recorded by James Otto on his 2004 album Days of Our Lives.

Track listing

Personnel
Bruce Bouton - steel guitar
Bekka Bramlett - background vocals
Perry Coleman - background vocals
Chad Cromwell - drums
Eric Darken - percussion
Chip Davis - background vocals
Glen Duncan - fiddle, mandolin
Andy Griggs - lead vocals, background vocals
Paul Leim - drums
Brent Mason - electric guitar
Frank J. Myers - background vocals
Jimmy Nichols - keyboards, Hammond organ, piano
Michael Rhodes - bass guitar
Neil Thrasher - background vocals
Ilya Toshinsky - banjo, acoustic guitar
Biff Watson - acoustic guitar

Chart performance

Singles

References

2008 albums
Andy Griggs albums
Montage Music Group albums